The Gulf Petrochemicals and Chemicals Association (GPCA) represents the downstream hydrocarbon industry in the Arab states of the Persian Gulf. Established in 2006, the association voices the common interests of more than 230 member companies from the chemical and allied industries, accounting for over 95% of chemical output in the Persian Gulf region. The industry makes up the second largest manufacturing sector in the region, producing up to US$97.3 billion worth of products a year.

The association supports the region's petrochemical and chemical industry through advocacy, networking and thought leadership initiatives.

Committed to providing a regional platform for stakeholders from across the industry, the GPCA manages six working committees – Plastics, Supply Chain, Fertilizers, International Trade, Research and Innovation, and Responsible Care – and organizes six conferences each year. The association also publishes an annual report, regular newsletters and reports.

The Chairman of Gulf Petrochemicals and Chemicals Association (GPCA) is Yousef Al-Benyan, Vice Chairman & CEO SABIC.

Chemistry trade associations
Petrochemical industry associations